Redoubt Lake, or Kunaa Shak Áayi, is a long, narrow lake on Baranof Island, near Sitka, Alaska. It is located in a glacially-carved valley in Tongass National Forest. It was named Ozero Glubokoye, meaning "deep lake", in 1809 by the Russian navigator Ivan Vasilyev.

Redoubt Lake is one of the largest meromictic lakes in North America.

In the early 19th century Redoubt Lake was part of Russian America. The Russians established a small settlement near the lake's outlet known variously as Ozersk Redoubt, Ozyorsk Redoubt, The Redoubt, Seleniye Dranishnikova, or Dranishnikov Settlement. Salmon traps were set in the lake and the catch was salted and dried at Ozersk Redoubt. Between 1817 and 1832 the Russians at Sitka and Ozersk Redoubt salted an average of 20,000 salmon annually.

Fish harvests by the Russians at Redoubt Lake sometimes exceeded 50,000 sockeye salmon per year. Annual escapements possibly exceeded 100,000 sockeye. In the 1980s, sockeye escapement or returns of adult fish had declined to an average less than 10,000 annually. Some years the numbers measured in the low hundreds.

Notes

Lakes of Alaska
Meromictic lakes
Lakes of Sitka, Alaska
Glacial lakes of the United States